The Charles A. Daniels School is a historic school building on Daniels Street in Malden, Massachusetts.  The Tudor Revival style brick building was constructed in 1907 to a design by Warren Hutchins.  The building has a large central block that is three stories high, with a gabled roof, and flanking flat-roofed wings of two stories that project from the main facade.  It has a particularly ornate limestone entrance portico.

The building was listed on the National Register of Historic Places in 1987. It now contains apartments.

See also
National Register of Historic Places listings in Middlesex County, Massachusetts

References

School buildings on the National Register of Historic Places in Massachusetts
Schools in Malden, Massachusetts
National Register of Historic Places in Middlesex County, Massachusetts